Aliados Futebol Clube de Lordelo is a Portuguese football club from Lordelo, Paredes. Founded in 1950, it currently plays in Porto's District Leagues, holding home games at Estádio Cidade de Lordelo, with a capacity of 1,500.

External links
Zerozero team profile
ForaDeJogo team profile 

Football clubs in Portugal
Association football clubs established in 1929
1929 establishments in Portugal